Kushkak (also Romanized as Kūshkak; also known as Kushgāk) is a village in Khoshkrud Rural District, in the Central District of Zarandieh County, Markazi Province, Iran. At the 2006 census, its population was 78, in 26 families.

References 

Populated places in Zarandieh County